Dindigul division is a revenue division in the Dindigul district of Tamil Nadu, India.

References 
 

Dindigul district